Lisa Breckenridge (born May 27, 1965) is a former American television personality and news anchor. She currently runs a blog called happilylisa.com.

Biography
Lisa Breckenridge was born May 27, 1965. Originally from Lodi, California, she went to Lodi Academy, graduating in the class of 1983. She graduated from Pacific Union College in the Napa Valley in 1987 and Stanford University's Mass Media Institute of Broadcast Journalism.

She worked at KYMA-DT in Yuma, Arizona, then at KOLO-TV in Reno, Nevada and at KCRA in Sacramento, California, before settling at KTTV as a reporter, fill-in anchor, and lifestyle correspondent for Good Day L.A., a job she held for 17 and a half years from 1999 to 2017. She left the channel in January 2017, noting that they were "restructuring."

She was married to talent manager Andy Cohen for 15 years; they announced their divorce in 2018. Together they have a son, Benjamin, and a daughter, Elsie, twins born in March 2005. Breckenridge is known for her trademark blonde bob haircut.
She has three sisters, Mitzi (Lodi, CA), Stephanie Dickinson (Redlands, CA) and Tiffany (Orange County, CA).
She is known as 'Chrissy' to her nephew (Brett Dickinson) and niece (Taylor Dickinson), though the reasoning behind this nickname is unclear.

References

External links
Lisa Breckenridge official biography on KTTV FOX 11 website, myfoxla.com.
Lisa Breckenridge's blog
[http://www.myfoxla.com/myfox/pages/InsideFox/GoodDay FOX 11 Morning News and Good Day LA]
TWIST OF FATE: Lisa Breckenridge & Andy Cohen
http://www.puc.edu/__data/assets/pdf_file/0017/62063/Winter-2010-Viewpoint-.pdf

1965 births
Living people
Pacific Union College alumni
Stanford University alumni
American women television journalists
Television anchors from Los Angeles
People from Lodi, California
21st-century American women